Glyphipterix simpliciella, the cocksfoot moth, is a species of moth of the  family Glyphipterigidae.

Distribution
This quite common species can be found in the western part of the Palearctic realm and is common in much of Great Britain and Ireland.

Habitat
These small moths mainly inhabit flower meadows, especially with buttercup and there are often many on one flower.

Description
Glyphipterix simpliciella has a wingspan of 6–9 mm. and can reach a length of 3–4 mm. These tiny cryptic moths have dark brown forewings with a slightly metallic sheen. They also show a black apical spot and five white or silvery streaks along their costa, two across the dorsum and one in the posterior corner of the wings. The hindwings are dark grey, with grey cilia. Both sexes are similar.

This species is rather similar to Glyphipterix equitella and Glyphipterix schoenicolella.

Biology
It is a univoltine species. Adults are on wing from May to July. They fly in the sunshine  and especially feed on nectar of buttercup (Ranunculus species), Crataegus monogyna, Euphorbia esula, and of various Apiaceae species (especially Leucanthemum vulgare).

The larvae feed on the seeds of cocksfoot (Dactylis glomerata), tall fescue (Festuca arundinacea) and Festuca pratensis. They later pupate in the stem.

Gallery

References

External links

 Microlepidoptera 
 Commanster

Glyphipterigidae
Moths described in 1834
Moths of Europe
Taxa named by James Francis Stephens